Hurricane Nora was the fourth of five tropical cyclones to make landfall in Mexico during the 2003 Pacific hurricane season. The fourteenth named storm and fifth hurricane of the season, Nora developed on October 1 from a tropical wave. It slowly intensified as it moved northwestward, intensifying into a hurricane on October 4. That day, Nora rapidly intensified to its peak of 100 mph (160 km/h), but the larger Hurricane Olaf to its east prevented further strengthening. An approaching trough turned the rapidly weakening system to the east toward Mexico. By October 7, it was downgraded to a tropical depression. Although it no longer met the criteria for being a tropical cyclone, the National Hurricane Center continued issuing advisories due to the cyclone's proximity with land. Nora unexpectedly redeveloped an area of thunderstorms and moved ashore near Mazatlán, Sinaloa on October 9 before dissipating. The depression dropped locally heavy rainfall in western Mexico, but there were no reports of damage. Later, the remnants combined with Olaf and an upper-level low to produce flooding and a tornado in central Texas.

Meteorological history

The origins of Nora were from a tropical wave that exited the west coast of Africa on September 13. It moved westward across the Atlantic Ocean and Caribbean Sea without developing. The wave axis crossed Central America on September 25, with its convection tracking westward along the southern Mexican coastline. On September 29, the system became better organized when it reached a position about 100 mi (160 km) south of Acapulco. Although upper-level wind shear was only marginally favorable, the National Hurricane Center first noted the potential for tropical cyclogenesis on September 30 over the subsequent few days. This verified on October 1 after the thunderstorms organized enough for the system to be classified as Tropical Depression Fourteen-E. At the time, it was located about 600 mi (975 km) south of the southern tip of the Baja California peninsula.

Upon developing, the depression had a well-defined low-level circulation, and with a ridge to the north, it moved south of due west. Conditions favored further development, including low wind shear and warm water temperatures. The convection gradually organized, and the depression intensified into Tropical Storm Nora early on October 2. Its motion briefly became nearly stationary as Nora rounded the furthest extent of the ridge, although a steady motion to the northwest began on October 3. That day, an eye feature developed in the center of the deep convection, and Nora attained hurricane status early on October 4. Steady intensification continued to winds of 100 mph (160 km/h) by later that day, and favorable conditions were expected to allow the hurricane to reach major hurricane status, or winds of 115 mph (185 km/h). However, Nora did not intensify further, due to unfavorable increased wind shear from the developing Tropical Storm Olaf to its east.

By October 5, the eye of Nora was no longer evident on satellite imagery, which indicated the beginning of a weakening trend. However, a Special Sensor Microwave/Imager observed a small eye that was open to the northwest. The convection became ragged, and on October 6 the winds decreased below hurricane-force. Around the same time, a strong approaching mid-level trough caused Nora to slow and turn to the east. Continued wind shear and the presence of dry air stripped the thunderstorms away from the center, and by October 7 all of the deep convection had dissipated. As a result, it was downgraded to a tropical depression, and Nora weakened to the extent that it barely met the criteria for being a tropical cyclone. The NHC maintained advisories due to the circulation's proximity to western Mexico, as well as the unlikely potential for redeveloping thunderstorms due to its movement over warmer waters. Nora accelerated to the east-northeast and later to the northeast due to the advancing trough. As it approached western Mexico, an area of curved convection unexpectedly developed over the center. Without additional redevelopment, the poorly defined circulation of Nora made landfall near Mazatlán, Sinaloa early on October 9. It dissipated shortly thereafter over the high terrain of western Mexico.

Preparations and impact

As Nora was expected to move ashore as a tropical depression, the National Hurricane Center did not issue any tropical storm warnings or watches. However, the Servicio Meteorológico Nacional, or Mexico's National Weather Service, issued 46 advisories and 16 caution bulletins on the storm. As the storm moved parallel to the Mexican coastline, it produced high waves. Later, when Nora moved ashore in Sinaloa, it dropped locally heavy rainfall. The peak 24-hour total was 3.75 in (95.3 mm) in Mazatlán, Sinaloa, recorded on October 8. The rainfall maximum for the previous day was 3.43 in (87.0 mm) in Gaviotas, Nayarit. Rainfall from Nora extended was also reported along the Baja California peninsula, and also extended from the coastline northward to near Texas. Its impact was minimal in western Mexico, and there were no reports of damage, deaths, or injuries.

Moisture from the remnants of Nora and Olaf interacted with an upper-level low to produce heavy rainfall across Texas, producing flooding near Waco that forced a family to evacuate in McGregor. The floodwaters closed portions of Interstate 35, U.S. Route 84, and Texas State Highway 36. The system also spawned a tornado in Sugar Land that damaged four buildings, including a school.

Nora was the final Pacific storm of the season to strike Mexico. The others were hurricanes Ignacio and Marty, and tropical storms Carlos and Olaf.

See also

 Other tropical cyclones named Nora

References

2003 Pacific hurricane season
Category 2 Pacific hurricanes
Pacific hurricanes in Mexico
Nora